Planeta is a surname. Notable people with the surname include:

Emil Planeta (1909–1963), American baseball pitcher 
Szimonetta Planéta (born 1993), Hungarian handball player